Macerich is a real estate investment trust that invests in shopping centers. It is the third-largest owner and operator of shopping centers in the United States. As of December 31, 2020, the company owned interests in 52 properties comprising 50 million square feet of leasable area. The company name is a portmanteau of its founders, Mace Siegel and Richard Cohen.

History
The company traces its antecedents to the MaceRich Real Estate Company founded in New York in 1964 by Mace Siegel and Richard Cohen who combined their first names to name their company.

In 1994, the company became a public company via an initial public offering.

In 2002, Macerich acquired Phoenix, Arizona-based Westcor for $1.475 billion. The purchase added 9 properties to Macerich's portfolio making them the largest mall owner in the Phoenix Metropolitan Area.

In 2005, the company acquired most of Rochester, New York-based Wilmorite Properties's portfolio for $2.333 billion, adding 11 shopping centers to Macerich's portfolio including Tysons Corner Center.

In 2006, the company name was rebranded to "Macerich."

On April 1, 2015, the company rejected a $16.8 billion takeover offer from Simon Property Group, claiming that the offer undervalued the company. Simon withdrew the offer.

Notable investments

See also
Shopping property management firms

References

External links
 
 

 
Companies listed on the New York Stock Exchange
Shopping center management firms
Companies based in Santa Monica, California
Real estate investment trusts of the United States
Real estate companies established in 1964
American companies established in 1964
1964 establishments in New York (state)
1994 initial public offerings